Jacob J. Gonzalez (born May 30, 2002) is an American college baseball shortstop for the Ole Miss Rebels.

Career
Raised in Glendora, California, Gonzalez grew up playing travel baseball with SGV Hustle in addition to playing for Glendora American Little League. He attended Glendora High School where he played football and was the school's starting quarterback in addition to playing baseball. For his high school baseball career, he batted .390 with 119 hits, four home runs, and 74 RBIs. He went undrafted in the 2020 Major League Baseball draft, and enrolled at Ole Miss to play college baseball.

Gonzalez was named the starting shortstop for Ole Miss as a freshman in 2021. Over 67 starts, he batted .355 with 12 home runs, 55 RBIs, and 16 doubles. He was named to the All-SEC First Team, was named Freshman of the Year by D1Baseball, and was named an All-American by D1Baseball and the National Collegiate Baseball Writers Association. He was just the second player in Ole Miss baseball history to be named an All-American as a freshman. He returned as the team's starting shortstop and began batting in the leadoff spot in 2022. Gonzalez ended the 2022 season slashing .273/.405/.558 with 18 home runs and 52 RBIs over 65 games, leading Ole Miss to their first ever NCAA Championship. Following the season's end, he played with the USA Baseball Collegiate National Team.

References

External links
Ole Mis Rebels baseball bio

2002 births
Living people
Baseball players from California
Baseball shortstops
Ole Miss Rebels baseball players